North Mansion and Tenant House, also known as the General William North House, is a historic home located at Duanesburg in Schenectady County, New York. The North Mansion was built about 1795 by General William North (1755–1836). It is a 2-story, five-bay, rectangular frame residence topped by a low-pitched hipped roof pierced by two large central chimneys.  It is representative of the Georgian style. The main entrance is flanked by slender pilasters and a slightly projecting pediment.  The tenant house was constructed in the 1780s and is a -story, altered saltbox-style residence.  Also on the property is a contributing barn.

The property was covered in a 1984 study of Duanesburg historical resources.
It was listed on the National Register of Historic Places in 1987.

References

External links
 

Houses completed in 1795
Houses on the National Register of Historic Places in New York (state)
Historic American Buildings Survey in New York (state)
Houses in Schenectady County, New York
Georgian architecture in New York (state)
National Register of Historic Places in Schenectady County, New York